Sherman Smith is well-known singer from Curaçao. His music has been in a number of international music charts, and is considered a prominent contributor to Kizomba music.

See also
 Curaçaoans in the Netherlands

References

External links

Date of birth missing (living people)
Living people
Kizomba singers
Year of birth missing (living people)